The Braničevo District is one of nine administrative districts of Southern and Eastern Serbia. It expands in the north-eastern parts of Serbia. According to the 2011 census results, it has a population of 180,480 inhabitants. The administrative center of the district is Požarevac.

It is named after the village of Braničevo.

History

In the 9th century, a Slavic (or Serb) tribe known as Braničevci are mentioned living in the region. In this time, the town named Braničevo also existed in the area, at the estuary of the river Mlava into Danube. In the Early Middle Ages, Braničevo became a part of the First Bulgarian Empire. After the conquest of Bulgaria, the Byzantines established the Theme of Sirmium in the wider region south of the river Danube.

By the 12th century, Braničevo was the centre of a Byzantine doukaton (duchy) governed by a doux (duke). The region saw significant fighting between the Byzantines and Hungarians. With the rise of the Second Bulgarian Empire and the Kingdom of Serbia, Byzantium's position in Braničevo became untenable. It appears to have finally slipped from their control in 1198. It was a frequent object of contention between  the Bulgars, Serbs and Hungarians thereafter.

In the 13th century the Hungarians established the Banate of Braničevo (Hungarian: Barancsi Bánság), but later in the century two local Bulgarian rulers, Darman and Kudelin, became independent and ruled over Braničevo and Kučevo. In 1291, they were defeated by the Serbian king, Stefan Dragutin, who joined Braničevo to his Syrmian Kingdom. Under his rule the town of Braničevo became a seat of the Eparchy of the Serbian Orthodox Church. The region later belonged to subsequent Serbian states, until it was conquered by the Ottoman Empire in the 15th century. In the 14th century, the region was in a possession of local rulers from the House of Rastislalić. During the Ottoman rule, Braničevo was part of the Sanjak of Smederevo, and since 19th century, it is again part of the Serbian state.

Culture
In the mid-nineteenth century, at the time of the Serbian state emancipation, Požarevac became, along with Kragujevac, the second metropolis of Prince Miloš Obrenović. During his lifetime, Prince Miloš Obrenović had erected monuments to his memory in Požarevac: 
the church in 1819
palace (1825)
new marketplace (1827)
stud-farm - Ljubicevo in 1860.

Some of the places of cultural importance in Požarevac are:
the National Museum (the first built after Belgrade)
the Tulba Ethnic Park (a unique outdoor museum)
Gallery of Paintings of Milena Pavlović-Barili (a distinguished surrealistic artist and poet).

Municipalities
The district encompasses the municipalities of:

 Veliko Gradište
 Požarevac
 Golubac
 Malo Crniće
 Žabari
 Petrovac
 Kučevo
 Žagubica

Demographics

According to the 2011 census results, the Braničevo District has a population of 183,625 inhabitants.

Ethnic groups
Ethnic composition of the Braničevo district:

See also
 Administrative divisions of Serbia
 Districts of Serbia

References

Sources

External links

 

 
Districts of Southern and Eastern Serbia